The Arauz Formation is an Emsian fossiliferous stratigraphic unit in Spain. It is a member of the Abadia Group. It is situated in the Province of Palencia, North Spain. It is in the north of Natural Park of Fuentes Carrionas and Fuente Cobre-Montaña Palentina where the Rio Arauz lies. It is from the Devonian of Spain.

Fossil content 
The following fossils have been reported from the formation:

 Trilobites
 Kayserops obsoletus
 Metacanthina cf. asnoensis
 Leonaspis sp.
 Metacanthina sp.
 Odontochile sp.
 Otarion (Maurotarion) sp.
 Xiphogonium sp.
 Phacopida indet.
 Cephalopods
 Erbenoceras advolvens
 Fidelites ruppachensis
 Gyroceratites gracilis
 G. aff. laevis
 Latanarcestes (Latanarcestes) noeggerathi
 Mimagoniatites bohemicus
 Mimosphinctes sp.
 Corals
 Cleistodictyum porosum
 Pleurodictyum microspinosum
 Procterodictyum polentinoi
 Combophyllum sp.
 Rugosa indet.
 Conodonts
 Icriodus bilatericrescens
 I. corniger
 I. culicellus
 I. fusiformis
 I. sigmoidalis
 Ozarkodina steinhornensis
 Polygnathus dehiscens
 P. gronbergi
 P. perbonus
 Icriodus sp.
 Tentaculita
 Nowakia barrandei
 N. cancellata
 N. elegans
 N. richteri
 Rhynchonellata
 Arduspirifer arduennensis
 Bifida lepida
 Euryspirifer paradoxus
 Holynatrypa mirabilis
 Mauispirifer scutiformis
 Prokopia bouskai
 Schizophoria vulvaria
 Strophomenata
 Bojodouvillina (Bojodouvillina) morzakeci
 Crinostrophia aff. elegans
 Eodevonaria cf. jahnkei
 Plectodonta (Dalejodiscus) minor
 Strophochonetes sp.

See also 
 List of fossiliferous stratigraphic units in Spain

References 

Geologic formations of Spain
Devonian System of Europe
Paleozoic Spain
Emsian Stage
Marl formations
Limestone formations
Shale formations
Fossiliferous stratigraphic units of Europe
Paleontology in Spain
Formations